Kurt Liebhart (22 August 1933 – 11 January 2010) was an Austrian sprint canoer who competed in the 1950s. He won a gold medal in the C-2 1000 m event at the 1954 ICF Canoe Sprint World Championships in Mâcon.

Competing in two Summer Olympics, he earned his best finish of sixth in the C-2 1000 m event at Helsinki in 1952.

References

Kurt Liebhart's obituary 

1933 births
2010 deaths
Austrian male canoeists
Canoeists at the 1952 Summer Olympics
Canoeists at the 1960 Summer Olympics
Olympic canoeists of Austria
ICF Canoe Sprint World Championships medalists in Canadian